Florence Chambers (November 2, 1907 – September 27, 1979), later known by her married name Florence Newkirk, was an American competition swimmer who represented the United States at the 1924 Summer Olympics in Paris.  She competed in the women's 100-meter backstroke, advanced to the event final, and finished fourth overall with a time of 1:30.8.

In 1970, Chambers was inducted by the San Diego Hall of Champions into the Breitbard Hall of Fame, honoring San Diego's finest athletes both on and off the playing surface.

References

External links
 
 obituary

1907 births
1979 deaths
American female backstroke swimmers
Olympic swimmers of the United States
Swimmers from San Diego
Swimmers at the 1924 Summer Olympics
20th-century American women
20th-century American people